The Congress of the Republic of Peru is the unicameral body that assumes legislative power in Peru. Due to broadly interpreted impeachment wording in the 1993 Constitution of Peru, the Congress can impeach the President of Peru without cause, effectively making the legislature more powerful than the executive branch. Following a ruling in February 2023 by the Constitutional Court of Peru, whose members are elected by Congress, judicial oversight of the legislative body was also removed by the court, essentially giving Congress absolute control of Peru's government.

Congress' composition is established by Chapter I of Title IV of the Constitution of Peru. Congress is composed of representatives who sit in congressional districts allocated to each region, as well as two special districts, Lima Province and Peruvian citizens living abroad, on a basis of population as measured by the Peruvian Census in multi-member districts. The number of voting representatives is fixed by the Constitution at 130. Pursuant to the 2017 Census, the largest delegation is that of Lima Province, with 36 representatives.
 
Congress is charged with the responsibility to pass laws and legislative resolutions, as well as to interpret, amend, or repeal existing laws. Congress also ratifies international treaties, approves the national budget, and authorizes loans on behalf of the country. It may also override presidential observations to bills by a vote of more than half the legal number of congressmen. It can also remove government official including the President, consent to the entry of foreign troops into the national territory, and authorize the President to leave the country. Congress meets at the Legislative Palace in Lima.

The presiding officer is the President of Congress, who is elected by the members thereof (and is therefore traditionally the leader of the controlling party). The President and three vice-presidents are chosen by the controlling governing coalition.

History

The first Peruvian Congress was installed in 1822 as the Constitutional Congress led by Francisco Xavier de Luna Pizarro. In 1829, the government installed a bicameral Congress, made up by a Senate and a Chamber of Deputies. This system was interrupted by a number of times by Constitutional Congresses that promulgated new Constitutions that lasted for a couple of years. The Deputies reunited in the Legislative Palace and the Senators went to the former Peruvian Inquisition of Lima until 1930, when Augusto B. Leguía was overthrown by Luis Miguel Sánchez Cerro. He installed a Constitutional Congress (1931–1933) that promulgated the Constitution of 1933. By order of the president, the Peruvian Aprista Party members that were in Congress were arrested for their revolutionary doctrines against the government. When Sánchez Cerro was assassinated in 1933 by an APRA member, General Óscar R. Benavides took power and closed Congress until 1939, when Manuel Prado Ugarteche was elected president. During various dictatorships, the Congress was interrupted by coups d'état. In 1968, Juan Velasco Alvarado overthrew president Fernando Belaúnde by a coup d'état, closing again the Congress.

The 1979 Constitution was promulgated on 12 July 1979 by the Constitutional Assembly elected following 10 years of military rule and replaced the suspended 1933 Constitution. It became effective in 1980 with the re-election of deposed President Fernando Belaúnde. It limited the president to a single five-year term and established a bicameral legislature consisting of a 60-member Senate (upper house) and a 180-member Chamber of Deputies (lower house). Members of both chambers were elected for five-year terms, running concurrently with that of the president. Party-list proportional representation was used for both chambers: on a regional basis for the Senate, and using the D'Hondt method for the lower house. Members of both houses had to be Peruvian citizens, with a minimum age of 25 for deputies and 35 for senators. At the beginning of the 1990s, the bicameral congress had a low public approval rating. President Alberto Fujimori did not have the majority in both chambers, the opposition led the Congress, impeding the power that Fujimori had as president. He made the decision of dissolving Congress by a self-coup to his government in 1992.

Following the self-coup, in which Congress was dissolved, the Democratic Constitutional Congress established a single chamber of 120 members. The Democratic Constitutional Congress promulgated the 1993 Constitution in which gave more power to the President. The new unicameral Congress started working in 1995, dominated by Fujimori's Congressmen that had the majority. The Congress permits a one-year term for a Congressman or Congresswoman to become President of Congress.

During the presidencies of Ollanta Humala, Pedro Pablo Kuczynski and Martín Vizcarra, the right-wing Congress led by the daughter of the former Peruvian dictator Alberto Fujimori, Keiko Fujimori, obstructed much of the actions performed by the presidents. According to Walter Albán, head of Transparency International Peru, the Congress of Peru has recently been infiltrated by criminal groups that obstruct reforms in order to maintain their status and parliamentary immunity.

The 2016-2021 congressional term was dissolved by President Martín Vizcarra in September 2019, triggering the 2019–2020 Peruvian constitutional crisis. Vizcarra issued a decree that set snap elections for 26 January 2020. The representatives served out the remainder of the original legislative term, which expired in July 2021. 

On 26 July 2021, the new and current Congress was sworn in, with an alliance led by Popular Action member María del Carmen Alva successfully gaining control of Peru's Congress.

On 7 December 2022, the president Pedro Castillo attempted self-coup d'état by unconstitutionally dissolve Congress and the state apparatus as a whole. He was subsequently impeached and removed by congress.

Membership

Qualifications
Article 90 of the Peruvian Constitution sets three qualifications for congressmen: (1) they must be natural-born citizens; (2) they must be at least 25 years old; (3) they must be an eligible voter. Candidates for president cannot simultaneously run for congress while vice-presidential candidates can.
Furthermore, Article 91 states that high-ranking government officers and any member of the armed forces or national police can only become congressmen six months after leaving their post.

Elections and term
Congressmen serve for a five-year term and can be re-elected indefinitely even though this is very rare. Elections for congress happen simultaneously as the election for president. Seats in congress are assigned to each region in proportion to the region's population. Congressional elections take place in April.

The D'Hondt method, a party-list proportional representation system, is used to allocate seats in congress. Political parties publish their party list for each region ahead of the election. Candidates do not need to be members of the political party they run for but may run for such party as a guest. Each candidate is assigned a number within the list. The citizenry thus votes for the party of their preference directly. Additionally, voters may write two specific candidates' number on the ballot as their personal preference.
The newly elected congress takes office on the 26 July of the year of the election.

Disciplinary action
Congressmen may not be tried or arrested without prior authorization from Congress from the time of their election until a month after the end of their term.
Congressmen must follow the Congress' code of ethics which is part of its self-established Standing Rules of Congress. La Comisión de Ética Parlamentaria, or Parliamentary Ethics Committee, is in charge of enforcing the code and punishing violators. Discipline consist of (a) private, written admonishments; (b) public admonishments through a Congressional resolution; (c) suspension from three to 120 days from their legislative functions.

Any congressmen may lose their parliamentary immunity if authorized by Congress. The process is started by the Criminal Sector of the Supreme Court who presents the case to the Presidency of Congress. The case is then referred to a special committee of 15 congressmen known as Comisión de Levantamiento de Inmunidad Parlamentaria, or Committee on Lifting Parliamentary Immunity, that decides if the petition should be heard by the body as a whole. The accused congressmen has the right to a lawyer and to defend himself before the committee and before the Plenary Assembly. The final decision is then communicated back to the Supreme Court.

Salary
Every congressman receives a monthly salary of 15,600 Peruvian soles (approximately US$4,000). They further receive 7,617 Peruvian soles (approximately $2,100) for congressional function expenses and 2,530 Peruvian soles (approximately $700) for congressional representation week expenses to support them in their official and representational duties to their district. Each congressman further receives a 33,027 Peruvian soles (approximately $9,000) personnel allowance. Congressman also receive a one-time extra monthly salary before the beginning of their term, known as an installation expenses allowance.

Officers

Presiding over Congress

President and Bureau

The most important officer is the President of Congress who is fourth in line of presidential succession if both the President and both vice-presidents are incapable of assuming the role. The President of Congress can only serve as interim president as he is required to call new elections if all three executive officers are not incapable of serving. This has happened once since the adoption of the current constitution when Valentín Paniagua became the interim president after the fall of the Alberto Fujimori regime in 2000.

The President of Congress is elected for a one-year term by the rest of Congress. Re-election is possible but uncommon. The President of Congress is almost always from the majority party. Its most important responsibility is to control and guide debate in Congress. He also signs, communicates and publishes bills and other decisions made by Congress. He may delegate any of these responsibilities to one of the vice-presidents of Congress.
The president serves along three vice-presidents who are collectively known as Mesa Directiva del Congreso, known as the Bureau in English. The three vice-presidents are not always from the same party as the president. The Bureau approves all administrative functions as well as all of Congress' internal financial policy and hiring needs. Any member of the Bureau may be censored by any member of Congress.

Executive Council
El Consejo Directivo, or Executive Council, consists of the four members of the Bureau as well as representatives from each political party in Congress which are known as Executive-Spokespersons. Its composition is directly proportional to the number of seats each party holds in Congress. The council has administrative and legislative responsibilities. Similar to the United States House Committee on Rules, it sets the calendar for the Plenary Assembly and fixes floor time for debating calendar items.

Committees

Board of Spokespersons
Each political party in Congress chooses a Spokesperson who acts as the party leader and is a member of the Board of Spokespersons alongside the members of the Bureau. The Board of Spokespersons main role deals with committee assignments as well as the flow of bills from the committees to the Plenary Assembly.

Secretariat General
La Oficialía Mayor, or Secretariat General, is the body of personnel led by the Secretary-General. It is responsible for assisting all members of Congress with daily managerial tasks. The Secretary-General is chosen and serves under the direction of the Bureau and Executive Council.

Procedure

Committees
Standing Committees are in charge of the study and report of routine business of the calendar, especially in the legislative and oversight function. The President of Congress, in coordination with Parliamentary Groups or upon consultation with the Executive Council, proposes the number of Standing Committees. Each party is allocated seats on committees in proportion to its overall strength.

Most committee work is performed by 24 standing committees. They examine matters within their jurisdiction of the corresponding government departments and ministries. They may also impede bills from reaching the Plenary Assembly.

There are two independent committees, the Permanent Assembly and the Parliamentary Ethics Committee.

Investigative and Special Committees
Investigative committee are in charge of investigating a specific topic as directed by Article 97 of the Constitution. Appearances before investigative committees are compulsory, under the same requirements as judicial proceedings. Investigative committee have the power to access any information necessary, including non-intrusive private information such as tax filings and bank financial statements. Investigative committees final reports are non-binding to judicial bodies.
Special committees are set up for ceremonial purposes or for the realization of special study or joint work with other government organizations or amongst congressional committees. They disband after they fulfill their assigned tasks.

The Permanent Assembly
The Permanent Assembly, or Comisión Permanente, fulfills the basic functions of Congress when it is under recess or break. It is not dissolved even if Congress is dissolved by the President. It also fulfills some Constitutional functions while Congress is in session similar to what an upper-chamber would. It has the responsibility of appointing high-ranking government officers and commencing the removal process of them as well as the heads of the two other branches of government. The Plenary Assembly may assign this committee special responsibilities excluding constitutional reform measures, approval of international treaties, organic acts, the budget, and the General Account of the Republic Act.
The Assembly consist of twenty-five percent of the total number of congressmen elected proportionally to the number of seats each party holds in Congress. They are installed within the first 15 days of the first session of Congress' term.

Parliamentary Ethics Committee
Congressmen must follow the Congress' code of ethics which is part of its self-established Standing Rules of Congress. La Comisión de Ética Parlamentaria, or Parliamentary Ethics Committee, is in charge of enforcing the code and punishing violators. Discipline consists of (a) private, written admonishments; (b) public admonishments through a Congressional resolution; (c) suspension from 3 to 120 days from their legislative functions.

Functions
Article 102 of the Peruvian Constitution delineated ten specific functions of Congress which deal with both its legislative power as well as its role as a check and a balance to the other branches of government:
 To pass laws and legislative resolutions, as well as to interpret, amend, or repeal existing laws.
 To ensure respect for the Constitution and the laws; and to do whatever is necessary to hold violators responsible.
 To conclude treaties, in accordance with the Constitution.
 To pass the Budget and the General Account.
 To authorize loans, in accordance with the Constitution.
 To exercise the right to amnesty.
 To approve the territorial demarcation proposed by the Executive Branch.
 To consent to the entry of foreign troops into the territory, whenever it does not affect, in any manner, national sovereignty.
 To authorize the President of the Republic to leave the country.
 To perform any other duties as provided in the Constitution and those inherent in the legislative function.

Current composition and election results

After widespread protests the previous year, the 2021 election saw a surge in support for the new left-wing Free Peru, which also won the presidential election with Pedro Castillo on the same day. However, a coalition of right-wing parties holds the majority of Congress and have been strongly opposed to President Castillo. The Fujimorist Popular Force, that had dominated the legislature during the reign of Keiko Fujimori, regained 9 seats from their poor performance in the 2020 election, making them the second largest party, while the new far-right Popular Renewal party also gained 13 seats while the conservative Go on Country won 7 seats. The previously dominant center-right parties Popular Action and Alliance for Progress both lost some seats. The new or previously minor parties that  had gained ground in the 2020 election, Purple Party, We Are Peru and Podemos Perú also all lost seats, while the Ethnocacerist Union for Peru, leftist Broad Front and Agrarian Agricultural People's Front all failed to win any seats. Contigo, the successor to former president Pedro Pablo Kuczynski's Peruvians for Change party, also failed to win a seat and continued its downwards trend of the previous election, receiving only around 0.05% of the vote.

Possible Reform
Peruvian expresident Martín Vizcarra proposed a series of political reforms as a response to the CNM audios scandal during his Independence Day message on 28 July 2018. One of his proposals was the establishment of a bicameral legislature similar to the one that existed in Peru before the 1993 Constitution.

Congress passed a version of Vizcarra's bicameralism proposal on 3 October 2018. Legislators were to be elected by direct elections similar to the ones held now for Congress for a period of five years. The presidency of Congress would alternate annually between the presidency of each one of the Chambers. Each chamber would take on special duties and responsibilities unique to their chamber. The Senate would approve treaties, authorize the mobilization of foreign troops into the national territory, and have the final say on accusations of high-ranking officials made by the Chamber of Deputies. The Chamber of Deputies would approve the budget, delegate legislative faculties to the executive, and conduct investigations. The proposal was modified by the Popular Force majority in Congress to weaken the power of the presidency and President Vizcarra quickly withdrew his support for creating a bicameral congress.

A referendum on the bicameralism proposal, as well as three other constitutional amendment proposals, was held on 9 December 2018. The bicameralism proposal was rejected by 90.52% of the voters as consequence of Vizcarra withdrawal of support for the proposal.

Congressman Omar Chehade presented a new bicameralism constitutional amendment in November 2020 which has so far not been approved by Congress.

See also
Politics of Peru
List of legislatures by country

References

External links
Official Peruvian Congress Site
Official Peruvian Congress Site in English
List of Members of Congress (Spanish)

Government of Peru
Peru
Peru